Nelda Speaks is an American politician who serves in the Arkansas House of Representatives in the 100th district.

References

External links 
Official Website
Nelda Speaks on Ballotpedia

Arkansas Republicans
Living people
Republican Party members of the Arkansas House of Representatives
Year of birth missing (living people)